Steve Blank (born 1953) is an American entrepreneur, educator, author and speaker based in Pescadero, California.

Blank created the customer development method that launched the lean startup movement, a methodology that recognized that startups are not smaller versions of large companies, but require their own set of processes and tools to be successful. His Lean Launchpad class (taught as the National Science Foundation Innovation Corps, or I-Corps) has become the standard for commercialization for all federal research and has trained 1,900 teams and launched 1,000+ startups. His Hacking for Defense Class has been adopted by the U.S. Department of Defense.

Biography
Blank was born to immigrant parents in the Chelsea neighborhood in New York City. He attended the University of Michigan for one semester. Blank spent four years in the U.S. Air Force, and spent time in Thailand during the Vietnam War, where he was maintaining electronic warfare equipment.

Blank arrived in Silicon Valley in 1978. His first job in the region was with ESL, a pioneering company for National Reconnaissance founded by William Perry, later the US Secretary of Defense. The company helped the government understand the Soviets' technological and arms developments during the Cold War. Blank was part of 8 startups include Zilog and MIPS Computers, Convergent Technologies, Ardent, SuperMac Technologies, ESL and Rocket Science Games.

Blank co-founded his last startup, the Customer Relationship Management provider E.piphany, in 1996 and retired the day before its IPO in September 1999.

In 2005, Blank published The Four Steps to the Epiphany: Successful Strategies for Products that Win, which details his approach to the Customer Development process.

In 2010, Blank released a second book, Not All Those Who Wander Are Lost which relates stories from his life as an entrepreneur. The collection of material develops a narrative about how to live life amid the fast-paced world of Silicon Valley startups.

Blank has given commencement addresses at Philadelphia University (2011), University of Minnesota (2013), ESADE Business School in Barcelona (2014),  New York University Engineering School (2016), Dalhousie University (2017) and UC Santa Cruz (2019).

The Startup Owner's Manual, co-authored by Steve Blank and Bob Dorf was released in March 2012. The book draws on ideas from Business Model Generation and The Four Steps to the Epiphany and emphasizes the importance of rigorous and repeated testing.

Blank served on the California Coastal Commission from 2007 until he resigned his seat in 2013.

Blank hosted the SiriusXM radio show “Entrepreneurs are Everywhere'' from 2015-2016.

Blank served as a member of the Defense Business Board until December 2020, when he resigned in protest due to "[t]he abrupt termination of more than half of the Defense Business Board and their replacement with political partisans."

Academic teaching career
Blank is an adjunct professor of entrepreneurship at Stanford and is a Senior Fellow for Entrepreneurship at Columbia University. He was a past lecturer at the UC Berkeley Haas School of Business, NYU and at Imperial College in London. His Lean LaunchPad and Hacking for Defense curricula uses the customer development methodology and lean startup methods he developed throughout his career as a serial entrepreneur and academic.

Philosophy and work

Customer development methodology
Blank began to develop the customer development methodology in the mid-1990s and began teaching it at UC Berkeley in 2003. The concept replaced the existing method of guessing customer needs and instead details a scientific approach that can be applied by startups and entrepreneurs to improve their products‘ success by developing a better understanding of customers' problems/needs as well as the other hypotheses necessary to build a commercially successful company.

Key customer development concepts 
Blank's customer development method includes four steps:

 There are no facts inside the building, so get outside
 While outside use the scientific method to test all the hypotheses about the proposed business model
 Hypothesis > design experiment > test > gather data > validate, invalidate or modify the hypothesis
 If you found the hypothesis wasn’t correct you could pivot i.e. modify the hypothesis
 The goal of the first two steps of customer development (Discovery and Validation) was to find the minimum feature set (also called the minimal viable product) that a startup could deliver.

None of these are original insights: Blank arranged existing concepts into an approach informed by his experiences as a product manager and entrepreneur. You can find the roots of the first step "get outside" in Taiichi Ohno's advice "go to the Gemba" and anthropologist Bronisław Malinowski advice to  "Come down off the veranda, come out of your studies and join the people." The next three steps are from the Scientific Method. The concept of a minimum viable product was coined and defined earlier by Frank Robinson.

Lean startup movement 

Blank's customer development methodology is a cornerstone of the lean startup movement, popularized by Eric Ries. The lean startup approach relies on validated learning, scientific experimentation, and iterative product releases to shorten product development cycles, measure progress, and gain valuable customer feedback. Blank developed the ideas beginning around 2004 when he was an investor and advisor to the company, IMVU, that Ries co-founded.  Ries observed that Customer Development was a natural pair to the Agile Development method that engineers were adopting. The lean startup has been adopted by entrepreneurs worldwide as an efficient and repeatable way to search for product/market fit. Ries has integrated the customer development methodology into the lean startup practices and considers it to be one of the lean startup movement's pillars.

Lean LaunchPad

In January 2011, Blank created the Lean LaunchPad class at Stanford University, Columbia Business School and UC Berkeley. The class is a method for teaching entrepreneurship that combines experiential learning with the three building blocks of a successful lean startup: Alexander Osterwalder's Business Model Canvas, Blank's customer development model, and agile engineering.

The Lean LaunchPad changed the way entrepreneurship is taught. Instead of relying on the traditional business school practice of teaching students how to write a standard corporate business plan, or simply build a product, the course provides hands-on experience in what it takes to start a company.

The course is taught in hundreds of universities worldwide including a free online version of the class at Udacity.

National Science Foundation Innovation Corps

In July 2011 the National Science Foundation asked Blank to adapt his Lean LaunchPad class to help scientists who were applying for an SBIR grant learn how to commercialize their academic inventions. The NSF adopted Blank's Stanford class and renamed it the Innovation Corps (I-Corps).

The course is now the standard for science commercialization, serving as the syllabus of the National Science Foundation Innovation Corps (I-Corps) that is taught in 100 universities and has been adopted by the other federal research agencies (NIH, DOE, HHS, NSA) and is helping to drive innovation within the U.S. government.

In 2012, Blank testified in front of congress about the program and in 2017 he testified before the Committee on Science, Space and Technology.

Mission-driven Entrepreneurship 
In 2016, Blank along with Peter Newell, and Joe Felter co-created the first of a series of mission-driven entrepreneurship classes based on the Lean Method - Hacking for Defense at Stanford University. This course teaches students to work with Defense and Intelligence communities on national security problems and develop solutions using the Lean Startup method. The course allows students to serve their country in a nontraditional way.

Also in 2016, the U.S. Department of State asked if Blank could create a version of the class, Hacking For Diplomacy, to have students work on State department problems. Blank co-created the class at Stanford with Professor Jeremy Weinstein and State Department representative to Silicon Valley Zvika Krieger.

As of 2021 the course is now offered in 55 universities in the U.S. via the National Security Innovation Network as well as in Australia and the UK.

Other mission-driven “Hacking” courses followed including Hacking for Oceans, and Hacking for Local.

In 2020 in the midst of the Covid pandemic Blank created a series of classes called Hacking for Recovery to help business adapt their business models in the crisis. The class was subsequently adopted by the State of Hawaii.

Technology, Innovation and Great Power Competition class 
In 2020, Blank co-created the Technology, Innovation and Modern War class with Joe Felter and Raj Shah (the ex head of the Defense Innovation Unit) at Stanford University. The class discusses how technology driven by commercial technology will create new military systems and concepts for future conflicts. In 2021 the class was expanded and renamed Technology, Innovation and Great Power Competition.

Lean Innovation Educator conferences 
Blank created a class to train educators to teach the Lean LaunchPad method. First hosted by the National Science Foundation, in 2019, Blank, in collaboration with the Common Mission project, hosted the first Lean Innovation Education Conference to now include educators teaching the mission-driven Hacking for Defense/Diplomacy/Oceans classes. This biannual event was created to share practices for teaching entrepreneurship and draws educators from universities around the world. In 2020 and early 2021 the conference was held virtually.

Awards and honors 
 2009 Silicon Valley Mercury News Top 10 Influencers in Silicon Valley
2012 The Harvard Business Review "One of 12 Masters of Innovation"
 2012 CNBC "11 Notable Entrepreneurs Teaching the Next Generation"
 2013 SVForum Visionary Award
2014 National Science Foundation and the NCIIA Outstanding Leadership Award 
2015 Columbia University Senior Fellow for Entrepreneurship
 2015 The Thinkers50 global ranking of management thinkers
 2017 Columbia University Senior Fellow for Entrepreneurship
2019 U.S. Association for Small Business and Entrepreneurship (USASBE) 2019 John E. Hughes Award for Entrepreneurial Achievement

Bibliography

Books 
Blank, Steve (2005) The Four Steps to the Epiphany: Successful Strategies for Products that Win, Wiley,  
 Blank, Steve (2010) Not All Those Who Wander Are Lost, Cafepress,  
 Blank, Steve; Bob Dorf (2012) The Startup Owner's Manual, Wiley,  
 Blank, Steve (2014) Holding a Cat by the Tail, K&S Ranch Publishing,

Selected publications 

 Blank, Steve. (2011) Embrace failure to start up success, Nature, 
 Blank, Steve. (May 2013) Why the lean start up changes everything, Harvard Business Review
 Blank, Steve. (September 2017) What your innovation process should look like, Harvard Business Review
 Blank, Steve. (November–December 2017) When founders go too far, Harvard Business Review
Blank, Steve. (February 2019) McKinsey’s three horizon model defined innovation for years. Here’s why it no longer applies, Harvard Business Review
Blank, Steve. (April 2019) How to Make Startup Stock Options a Better Deal For Employees, Harvard Business Review
Blank, Steve. (September 2019) AgileFall - When Waterfall Principles sneaks back into Agile Workflows, Harvard Business Review
 Blank, Steve. (October 2019) Why companies do innovation theater instead of actual innovation, Harvard Business Review
Blank, Steve. (2020) A 5-Day Plan to Keep Your Company Afloat, Harvard Business Review

References

External links

 

American computer businesspeople
Living people
1953 births
University of Michigan alumni
People from San Mateo County, California
People from Pescadero, California